Evans Omondi (born 12 December 1979) is a Kenyan former footballer who played as a goalkeeper.

Career
Omondi has played club football for World Hope, Chemelil Sugar, SoNy Sugar, Congo United and Nakuru AllStars.

He earned one cap for the Kenyan national team in 2007.

References

1979 births
Living people
Kenyan footballers
Kenya international footballers
Nairobi City Stars players
Chemelil Sugar F.C. players
SoNy Sugar F.C. players
F.C. West Ham United players
Nakuru AllStars players
Association football goalkeepers
Kenyan Premier League players